Thomas McLintock was a Scottish professional footballer who played as a full back. He played well over 200 matches in the English Football League for Burnley.

References

Year of birth unknown
People from Maybole
Scottish footballers
Association football fullbacks
Clyde F.C. players
Kilmarnock F.C. players
Burnley F.C. players
English Football League players
Scottish Football League players
Year of death missing
Footballers from South Ayrshire